The Bishoprick Garland is a book compiled by Cuthbert Sharp which gives historical details of people, places and events from the Bishopric of Durham, and was published in 1834.

Details
The Bishoprick Garland – (full title – "The Bishoprick Garland, Or a collection of Legends, Songs, Ballads, &c. Belonging to the County of Durham. [By Sir Cuthbert Sharpe]". London: Nichols, and Baldwin & Cradock. 1834) is a book of approximately 84 pages, giving historical details of people, places, songs, poems and writers pertaining to the North East of England, and in particular the County of Durham or more correctly termed Bishoprick of Durham (using an obsolete spelling of bishopric).

It contains Geordie folk songs (or extracts from) and contains over 150 such song/poem lyric extracts on over 80 pages, and was published in 1834. It was edited by (Sir) Cuthbert Sharp.

Bibliographical details 
It is, as the title suggests (this meaning of garland being a collection of short literary pieces, such as ballads or poems; miscellany or anthology), a collection of historical facts from the area of the Bishopric of Durham. There are a surprising large number of entries and biographies, but disappointingly most of the songs/poetry are in the form of extracts, and some biographies are quite short.

The front cover of the book is thus :-

THE
BISHOPRICK GARLAND, 
OR A COLLECTION OF
Legends, Songs, Ballads, &c. 
BELONGING TO
THE COUNTY OF DURHAM. 
[By Sir Cuthbert Sharpe] 
"That old and antique song we heard last night, 
Methought, it did relieve my passion much, 
More than light airs, and recollected terms, 
Of these most brisk and giddy-paced times." 
Twelfth Night. 
LONDON: 
NICHOLS, AND BALDWIN & CRADOCK. 
1834

Contents

Notes
B W1 – according to Bell's – Rhymes of Northern Bards 1812, the writer is M W of North Shields

References

Further reading
A facsimile reprint:- Newcastle upon Tyne: Frank Graham, 1969

External links
 The Bishoprick Garland 1834 by Sharp

English folk songs
Songs related to Newcastle upon Tyne
County Durham
Northumbrian folklore
Chapbooks
1834 books
Music books